Brent Carelse (born 30 March 1981) is a South African former soccer player who played as a midfielder. He played club football for Hellenic, Ajax Cape Town, Mamelodi Sundowns, Supersport United, Chippa United and Cape Town All Stars and international football for South Africa.

Club career
In February 2016, he rejoined former club Hellenic.

International career
He made one appearance for South Africa in 2007.

Coaching career
He was appointed as under-19 coach at Cape Town City in March 2017.

Personal life
Like Steven Pienaar, Carelse was born in Westbury, a township on the outskirts of Johannesburg. He is the son of former footballer Dougie Carelse.

References

External links
 
 

1981 births
South African soccer players
South Africa international soccer players
Living people
Sportspeople from Johannesburg
Cape Town Spurs F.C. players
Mamelodi Sundowns F.C. players
Association football midfielders
SuperSport United F.C. players
Cape Coloureds
Hellenic F.C. players
Chippa United F.C. players